Debendra Nath Roy (1955 – 13 July 2020) was an Indian politician. He was elected to the West Bengal Legislative Assembly from Hemtabad in the 2016 West Bengal Legislative Assembly election as a member of the Communist Party of India (Marxist) and later joined the Bharatiya Janata Party. In May 2019, he along with Subhranshu Roy, Tushar Kanti Bhattacharya and more than 50 Councillors joined the Bharatiya Janata Party in the presence of senior BJP leaders Mukul Roy and Kailash Vijayvargiya.

Roy was found dead on 13 July 2020, hanging in front of a shop at Balia More, Raiganj, with one hand tied with the same rope from which he was hanging, just 1 km away from his home. His family claimed that the death was not a suicide, and demanded an inquiry from the Central Bureau of Investigation.

References

1955 births
2020 deaths
West Bengal MLAs 2016–2021
Bharatiya Janata Party politicians from West Bengal
Communist Party of India (Marxist) politicians from West Bengal
People from Uttar Dinajpur district
Deaths from asphyxiation